Jessica M. Marglin is an American historian of religion. She is an Associate Professor of Religion at University of Southern California (USC) and served as USC's Ruth Ziegler Early Career Chair in Jewish Studies from 2016 to 2019. She is the author of Across Legal Lines: Jews and Muslims in Modern Morocco, which won the 2016 Baron Book prize, awarded by the American Academy for Jewish Research for best first book in Judaic studies.

Early life and education
Marglin is the daughter of Smith College anthropologist Frédérique Apffel-Marglin and Harvard economist Stephen A. Marglin. She earned her undergraduate degree from Harvard College in 2006 as well as a master's degree in Middle Eastern studies. From 2006 to 2007, she was a Fulbright Fellow studying the history of Jews in North Africa at Hebrew University of Jerusalem. She earned her doctorate in Near Eastern studies at Princeton University.

Works
 Across Legal Lines: Jews and Muslims in Modern Morocco (Yale University Press, 2016)

Awards 
 2017: National Jewish Book Award in the Sephardic Culture category for Across Legal Lines

References

Year of birth missing (living people)
Living people
University of Southern California faculty
American theologians
Princeton University alumni
Harvard University alumni